Tall Battal, also spelled Til Betal or Tal Bital, is a village in northern Aleppo Governorate, northwestern Syria.

Administratively the village belongs to Nahiya Akhtarin in A'zaz District. Nearby localities include Tall Jurji  to the east, and Qar Kalbin  to the west on the Queiq Plain. In the 2004 census, Tall Battal had a population of 656.

References

Villages in Aleppo Governorate